The 2018 Philippine Basketball Association (PBA) Governors' Cup, also known as the 2018 Honda Click–PBA Governor's Cup for sponsorship reasons, was the third and last conference of the 2017–18 PBA season. The tournament allowed teams to hire foreign players or imports with a height limit of 6'5".

Format
The tournament format for this conference is as follows:
 Single-round robin eliminations; 11 games per team; Teams are then seeded by basis on win–loss records. 
Top eight teams will advance to the quarterfinals.  In case of tie, a playoff game will be held only for the #8 seed.
Quarterfinals (higher seed with the twice-to-beat advantage):
QF1: #1 seed vs #8 seed
QF2: #2 seed vs #7 seed
QF3: #3 seed vs #6 seed
QF4: #4 seed vs #5 seed
Semifinals (best-of-5 series):
SF1: QF1 vs. QF4 winners
SF2: QF2 vs. QF3 winners
Finals (best-of-7 series)
Winners of the semifinals

Elimination round

Team standings

Schedule

Results

Bracket

Quarterfinals

(1) Barangay Ginebra vs. (8) NLEX

(2) Phoenix vs. (7) Meralco

(3) Alaska vs. (6) San Miguel

(4) Magnolia vs. (5) Blackwater

Semifinals

(1) Barangay Ginebra vs. (4) Magnolia

(3) Alaska vs. (7) Meralco

Finals

Imports 
The following is the list of imports, which had played for their respective teams at least once, with the returning imports in italics. Highlighted are the imports who stayed with their respective teams for the whole conference.

Awards

Conference
Best Player of the Conference: Paul Lee 
Best Import of the Conference: Mike Harris 
Finals MVP: Mark Barroca

Players of the Week

References

External links
 PBA Official Website

PBA Governors' Cup
Governors' Cup